Succinylacetone is a chemical compound that is formed by the oxidation of glycine and is a precursor of methylglyoxal.  
It is a pathognomonic compound found in the urine of patients with tyrosinemia type 1, which is due to congenital deficiency of an enzyme, fumarylacetoacetate hydrolase. This enzyme is involved in the catabolism of tyrosine, and if deficient, leads to accumulation of fumarylacetoacetate which is subsequently converted to succinylacetone which can be detected in the urine by GCMS. Succinylacetone also inhibits ALA dehydratase (PBG synthase) which increases ALA and precipitates acute neuropathic symptoms, similar to porphyria.

References

Diketones
Carboxylic acids